The Kansas City Scouts was a professional ice hockey team based in Kansas City, Missouri. The team was a member of the Smythe Division of the Campbell Conference of the National Hockey League (NHL). The Scouts joined the NHL in 1974, along with the Washington Capitals. The Scouts played at Kemper Arena. Poor attendance, financial mismanagement, and the team's poor play led the franchise to move to Denver, Colorado in 1976, where it was rechristened the Colorado Rockies. The team would later move to New Jersey, where it found success as the New Jersey Devils, and the team remains there to this day.

The team would finish at the bottom of the Smythe Division for two years, missing the playoffs both times. In fact, the only team to fare worse than the Scouts in the two seasons were its expansion brethren, the Capitals, who set an NHL record by winning only 8 games in the 1974–75 season.

Table key

Year by year
Key

Statistics
{| class="wikitable" style="text-align: center; font-size: 95%"
|-
!rowspan="2"| NHL season
!rowspan="2"| Scouts season
!rowspan="2"| Conference
!rowspan="2"| Division
!colspan="9"| Regular season
!colspan="7"| Postseason
|-
! Finish
! GP
! W
! L
! T
! OTL
! Pts
! GF
! GA
! GP
! W
! L
! T
! GF
! GA
! Result
|-
| 1974–75
| 1974–75
| Campbell
| Smythe
| 5th
| 80
| 15
| 54
| 11
| –
| 41
| 184
| 328
| –
| –
| –
| –
| –
| –
| Did not qualify
|-
| 1975–76
| 1975–76
| Campbell
| Smythe
| 5th
| 80
| 12
| 56
| 12
| –
| 36
| 190
| 351
| –
| –
| –
| –
| –
| –
| Did not qualify
|-
| colspan="20" align="center" | Relocated to Colorado
|- style="font-weight:bold; background-color:#dddddd;" 
| colspan="5"| Totals
| 160
| 27
| 110
| 23
| –
| 77
| 374
| 679
| –
| –
| –
| –
| –
| –
|

See also
List of Colorado Rockies (NHL) seasons
List of New Jersey Devils seasons

References
General
 

Specific

 

Kansas City Scouts
seasons